Donggang Township or Tungkang Township is an urban township in west-central Pingtung County, Taiwan.  Located on Taiwan's western coastline, along the Taiwan Strait, it has one of Taiwan's largest fishing harbors. Dapeng Bay with its national scenic area is just south of Donggang. 

The town also hosts Donglong Temple, which is dedicated to "Lord Wen" (the word Wen is pronounced the same as "plague" in Chinese) and is known for its triannual ceremony of "burning lord's boat" (burning plague boat).

History
Donggang was opened as a port by the Chinese admiral Koxinga in the 17th century. It was a major commercial port for Taiwan until the end of the 19th century.  During Japanese rule, it was placed under Takao Prefecture as Tōkō town (東港街) and served the Japanese naval facilities in Dapeng Bay.

Administrative divisions
The township comprises 23 villages: Bade, Chengyu, Chuantou, Dapeng, Datan, Dingxin, Dingzhong, Fengyu, Gonghe, Jialian, Nanping, Tunghe, Tunglong, Xiabu, Xinghe, Xingnong, Xingtai, Xingtung, Xingyu, Xinsheng, Zenghai, Zhaoan and Zhongxing.

Economy
Donggang's primary economic activities are fishing and agriculture. The town has a tourism industry which peaks during April to June, due to the availability and increasing popularity of the southern bluefin tuna for sashimi. The town's other delicacies include karasumi (desalinated mullet roe) and sakura shrimp.

Tourist attractions
 Dapeng Bay national scenic area
 Donglong Temple
 Jinde Bridge
 Penbay International Circuit
 Tongkang Mosque

Notable natives
 Kuo Ting-tsai, member of Legislative Yuan (1993–2002)
 Lee Shying-jow, Minister of Veterans Affairs Council (2016–2018)

Transportation
The nearest railway stations to Donggang Township are Nanzhou Station or Linbian Station of the TRA Pingtung Line. Ferry services connect Donggang to Baisha Port and Dafu Port on Lamay Island.

References

External links

Staff (2003) "Tastes and Colors of Pingtung: The Three Treasures of Tungkang" Sinorama Magazine
Tunkang Coastline, Pingtung County (Taiwan) Coastal Photograph by Hubert Chanson, Journal of Coastal Research, Vol. 25, No. 5, Sept., p. 1176 (ISSN 0749-0208)

Townships in Pingtung County